The This Is What the Truth Feels Like Tour was the third solo concert tour by American singer-songwriter Gwen Stefani, in support of her third solo studio album, This Is What the Truth Feels Like (2016). It began on July 12, 2016, in Mansfield, Massachusetts at the Xfinity Center and continued throughout North America before concluding on October 16, 2016, in Inglewood, California at The Forum.

Background
The tour was officially revealed in late April 2016 with twenty-seven dates in the US and Canada. Stefani will tour together with Eve, with whom she already collaborated on the singles "Let Me Blow Ya Mind" and "Rich Girl".

Setlist
This setlist was obtained from the July 12, 2016, concert, held at the Xfinity Center in Mansfield, Massachusetts. It does not represent all concerts for the duration of the tour.

 "Red Flag"
 "Wind It Up"
 "Baby Don't Lie"
 "Obsessed"
 "Where Would I Be?"
 "Cool"
 "Make Me Like You"
 "Danger Zone"
 "Misery" 
 "Luxurious"
 "Harajuku Girls" / "Let Me Blow Ya Mind" 
 "Rich Girl" 
 "Hella Good"
 "Rare"
 "What You Waiting For?"
 "It's My Life"
 "Asking 4 It"
 "Don't Speak"
 "Naughty"
 "Used to Love You"
 "Hollaback Girl"
Encore
  "Truth" 
 "Just a Girl" 
 "The Sweet Escape"

Tour dates

References

General

External links
Official tour page

Gwen Stefani concert tours
2016 concert tours